Cachet  (Pronunciation: cash-AY) is a neighbourhood within northwestern Markham, Ontario, Canada. It is bounded by 16th Avenue to the south, Major Mackenzie Drive East to the north, Warden Avenue to the east and Woodbine Avenue or Highway 404 (depending on exact definition), to the west.

The area is a residential development that has replaced farmland that once defined the area. The residents of Cachet consist mostly of middle to upper-income families and the housing consists of large single family homes. The Cachet Centre is a small strip mall that services mainly to local residents. There is also an Asian shopping centre at the intersection of Woodbine Avenue and Markland Street, called King Square. When the shopping centre is completed, it would be considered the largest Asian mall in North America. It is to be completed around 2020. The population of the community is predominantly Chinese and small minority of European heritage.

The Rouge River and Berczy Creek flows through the community. This neighbourhood is also home to Ashton Meadows Public School, St. Monica Catholic Elementary School, and St. Augustine Catholic High School. The Ashton Meadows community consists of government housing. Many students who attended Ashton Meadows Public School go on to Pierre Elliott Trudeau High School, located at Berczy Village, on Bur Oak Avenue and Kennedy Road.

Transportation
Cachet is a short distance from Highway 404 via the interchange at 16th Avenue. It is also a short distance from the Buttonville Airport, which is slated to be closed and redeveloped.

Parks

 Ashton Meadows Park
 Calvert Park
 Personna Park

Trail Parks 

 Macrill Crescent Pond
 Thomas Frisby Woods

Development

Construction Phase

Housing Type Mix

References

Neighbourhoods in Markham, Ontario